Delaware Valley University station is a small station along the SEPTA Lansdale/Doylestown Line. It is located on the campus of Delaware Valley University, just off of U.S. Route 202. This stop is often referred to as "Del Val". It was originally named Farm School by the Reading Company until the 1960s, reflecting the college's original name of National Farm School. The station was called Delaware Valley College station until the university changed its name in 2015. In FY 2013, the station had a weekday average of 68 boardings and 70 alightings.  A small-scale improvement project is in the planning to help beautify the station; if approved, hanging flower baskets, new paint and directory signs would be added to the structure. This station is wheelchair accessible.

Station layout

References

External links
SEPTA – Delaware Valley University Station

SEPTA Regional Rail stations
Stations on the Doylestown Line
Railway stations in Bucks County, Pennsylvania
Railway stations in Pennsylvania at university and college campuses